Norman is a small lunar impact crater on the Oceanus Procellarum, to the south and slightly west of the crater Euclides. To the west-southwest is Herigonius. There are few other features of note in the vicinity, apart from some minor wrinkle ridges in the surface of the mare.

Norman is a circular, bowl-shaped formation with a small floor at the midpoint of the sloping inner walls. This feature was previously designated Euclides B prior to being renamed by the IAU.

References

 
 
 
 
 
 
 
 
 
 
 
 

Impact craters on the Moon